Henry Gallagher may refer to:

Henry Joseph Gallagher (1914–1988), Korean War veteran
Henry M. Gallagher (1885–1965), American lawyer and judge
Harry Gallagher (Henry Thomas Gallagher, 1880–1975), Irish businessman, solicitor